Bogdarnya is a rural locality (a village) in Petushinskoye Rural Settlement, Petushinsky District, Vladimir Oblast, Russia. The population was 20 as of 2010. There are 3 streets.

Geography 
Bogdarnya is located on the Bogdarinskoye Lake, 16 km southwest of Petushki (the district's administrative centre) by road. Borok is the nearest rural locality.

References 

Rural localities in Petushinsky District